2044 Wirt, provisional designation , is a binary Phocaea asteroid and Mars-crosser, approximately 6.7 kilometers in diameter. The minor-planet moon has an estimated diameter of 1.89 kilometer.

The asteroid was discovered on 8 November 1950, by American astronomer Carl Wirtanen at Lick Observatory on Mount Hamilton, California, and later named after the discoverer himself.

Orbit and classification 

Wirt is both a member of the main-belt's Phocaea family and a Mars-crossing asteroid, whose orbit crosses that of Mars. It orbits the Sun in the inner main-belt at a distance of 1.6–3.2 AU once every 3 years and 8 months (1,342 days). Its orbit has an eccentricity of 0.34 and an inclination of 24° with respect to the ecliptic.

The asteroid's observation arc begins two weeks after its official discovery with the first recorded observation at Lick Observatory on 22 November 1950.

Physical characteristics 

Wirt has been characterized as a stony S-type asteroid.

Rotation period 

Between 2005 and 2010, several rotational lightcurve were obtained for this asteroid from photometric observations taken by astronomers Donald Pray, Petr Pravec, Peter Kušnirák, Walter Cooney, Rui Goncalves and Raoul Behrend, as well as at the Palomar Transient Factory. The lightcurves gave a well-defined rotation period between 3.689 and 3.690 hours with a brightness variation between 0.12 and 0.26 magnitude.

Satellite 

During the photometric observations in December 2005, a minor-planet moon in orbit of Wirt was discovered. The binary asteroid has diameter ratio of 0.25, and the moon's orbital period is 18.97 hours. It measures approximately 1.89 kilometer in diameter.

Diameter and albedo 

According to the survey carried out by the Infrared Astronomical Satellite IRAS, the asteroid measures 6.66 kilometers in diameter and its surface has an albedo of 0.19, while the Collaborative Asteroid Lightcurve Link assumes an albedo of 0.23 and calculates a diameter of 6.65 kilometers with an absolute magnitude of 13.1.

Naming 

It was named after American astronomer Carl Wirtanen (1910–1990), a discoverer of minor planets and comets, who was a long-time contributor of astrometric observations at Lick Observatory. It is one of the rare cases where the asteroid had been named after its discoverer. Wirtanen is known for several surveys conducted at Lick Observatory such as the Lick proper motion program with respect to galaxies and the Shane-Wirtanen survey. The official naming citation was published by the MPC on 1 January 1981.

References

External links 
 Asteroids with Satellites, Robert Johnston, johnstonsarchive.net
 Asteroid Lightcurve Database (LCDB), query form (info )
 Dictionary of Minor Planet Names, Google books
 Asteroids and comets rotation curves, CdR – Observatoire de Geneve, Raoul Behrend
 
 

002044
002044
Discoveries by Carl A. Wirtanen
Named minor planets
002044
19501108